Papa N'Diaye can refer to:

 Papa Waly N'Diaye
 Papa M'Baye N'Diaye